Frank Kent Smith (March 19, 1907 – April 23, 1985) was an American actor who had a lengthy career in film, theatre and television.

Early years
Smith was the son of Mr. and Mrs. James E. Smith. He was born in New York City and was educated at Lincoln School, Phillips Exeter Academy in Exeter, New Hampshire, and at Harvard University.

Stage 
Smith's early acting experience started in 1925 when he was one of the founders of the Harvard University Players, which later included Henry Fonda, James Stewart, Joshua Logan and Margaret Sullavan in Falmouth, Massachusetts. Smith's stock experience included productions with the Maryland Theatre in Baltimore. His professional acting debut was in 1929 in Blind Window in Baltimore. He made his Broadway acting debut in 1932 in Men Must Fight. He appeared on Broadway in Measure for Measure, Sweet Love Remembered, The Best Man, Ah, Wilderness!, Dodsworth (1934), Saint Joan (1936), Old Acquaintance (1941), Antony and Cleopatra (1948) and Bus Stop (1956).

Film 
Smith moved to Hollywood, California, where he made his film debut in The Garden Murder Case.

His biggest successes occurred during the 1940s in films such as Cat People (1942), Hitler's Children (1943), This Land Is Mine (1943), Three Russian Girls (1943), Youth Runs Wild (1944), The Curse of the Cat People (1944), The Spiral Staircase (1946), Nora Prentiss (1947), Magic Town (1947), My Foolish Heart (1949), The Fountainhead (1949), and The Damned Don't Cry (1950). He continued acting in films such as Comanche (1956), Sayonara (1957), Party Girl (1958), The Mugger (1958), Imitation General (1958), The Badlanders (1958), This Earth Is Mine (1959), Strangers When We Meet (1960), Susan Slade (1961), The Balcony (1963), A Distant Trumpet (1964), Youngblood Hawke (1964), The Young Lovers (1964), The Trouble with Angels (1966), A Covenant with Death (1967), Games (1967), The Money Jungle (1968), Kona Coast (1968), Assignment to Kill (1968), Death of a Gunfighter (1969), The Games (1970), Pete 'n' Tillie (1972), Die Sister, Die! (1972), Lost Horizon (1973) and Billy Jack Goes to Washington (1977).

During World War II, Smith served as a private in the U.S. Army, making training films covering among others, medical, dental, artillery, and electronics.

Television

Regular cast
Kent Smith played the imperious Dr. Morton on the popular series Peyton Place with his actual wife (Edith Atwater) cast as Mrs. Morton. Smith played Edgar Scoville in the second season of the science-fiction series The Invaders (1967-1968) and was a host for the  anthology series Philip Morris Playhouse (1953-1954).

Guest appearances
Smith had roles in TV movies such as How Awful About Allan (1970), The Night Stalker (1972), The Judge and Jake Wyler (1972), The Cat Creature (1973), The Affair (1973) and The Disappearance of Flight 412 (1974). His numerous television credits included a continuing role in Peyton Place as Dr. Robert Morton. He began guest-starring in television series in 1949 in The Philco Television Playhouse and appeared in Robert Montgomery Presents, General Electric Theater, Alfred Hitchcock Presents, Naked City, Have Gun Will Travel, Perry Mason, Gunsmoke (in 1963: once a “Beaton”, a man trying to steal two Irish Immigrant’s land in “Two of a Kind” (S8E27) and later that year as "Dakota", an aging gunslinger in “The Glory & The Mud” (S9E14), The Beverly Hillbillies, Rawhide, The Americans, Barnaby Jones, Gunsmoke, Wagon Train (in 1957 as "Professor Paul Owens" - husband to Shelley Winters - in "The Ruth Owens Story" (S1E3), The Outer Limits, Mission Impossible ("The Confession" 1/22 (1967), Night Gallery, and the 1976 miniseries Once an Eagle.

Personal life
Smith was married to actress Betty Gillette from 1937 until 1954 and to actress Edith Atwater from 1962 until his death from congestive heart failure in Woodland Hills, California at the age of 78. 

He was survived by his wife and daughter.

Smith was a Republican and campaigned for Dwight Eisenhower in the 1952 presidential election. In 1961, he said: "I'm capricious when there's a national election. My background's Republican, but whenever I'm planted in a city long enough to vote on the local level, I find I'm against whoever is in office."

Filmography

References

External links

1907 births
1985 deaths
American male film actors
American male stage actors
American male television actors
Male actors from New York City
20th-century American male actors
New York (state) Republicans
California Republicans
Military personnel from New York City
Harvard University alumni